The Supreme Court of the United States Police is a federal law enforcement agency that derives its authority from . The Supreme Court Police enforces federal and District of Columbia laws and regulations, as well as enforces regulations governing the Supreme Court Building and grounds prescribed by the marshal and approved by the chief justice of the United States. The department's mission is to ensure the integrity of the constitutional mission of the Supreme Court of the United States by protecting the Supreme Court, the justices, employees, guests, and visitors.

History
Established in 1935, the Supreme Court security force was tasked to provide protection for the new Supreme Court building. The Court had previously resided in the United States Capitol, and the original force of 33 officers were selected from the ranks of the United States Capitol Police. , the Supreme Court Police has an authorized force of 190 officers.

Duties
The Supreme Court Police are responsible for providing a full range of police services, including:
 Protection of the Supreme Court Building and grounds, and persons and property therein;
 Dignitary Protection for the Supreme Court Justices, both domestically and Internationally;
 Maintain suitable order and decorum within the Supreme Court Building and grounds, to include policing demonstrations and large-scale events;
 Provide Courtroom security;
 Prepare numerous reports to include incident, found property, accident, and arrest reports, as well as testify in court. 

Special Units are available to officers depending on time-in-service, completion of training, and experience.

Units

The Supreme Court Police offers both part-time and full-time specialized units. These units include:
 Dignitary Protection Unit
 Protective Intelligence Unit
 K-9 Unit
 Background Investigations Unit
 Nuclear, Biological, Chemical (NBC) Team
 Recruitment Division
 Police Operations Center - Dispatch
 Physical Security Unit
 Liaison positions with partner agencies (FBI, JTTF, DHS, USCP)
 Civil Disturbance Unit
 Training Unit
 Radio Technicians
 Honor Guard
 Various instructor positions, including: Firearms, Driving, Defensive Tactics, CPR/First Aid, Fitness Coordinators.

Training

Supreme Court Police Officers attend the 13 week Uniformed Police Training Program (UPTP) at the Federal Law Enforcement Training Center (FLETC) in Georgia. Designated members of specialized units attend the Criminal Investigator Training Program (CITP) at FLETC. Working for the Supreme Court of the United States Police offers a comprehensive benefits package that includes, in part, paid vacation, sick leave, holidays, life insurance, health insurance benefits, premium pay, and eligibility for retirement with 20 years of service at age 50, or 25 years’ service at any age. Requirements and qualifications for the position are listed on the Supreme Court's website and on USAjobs. Applications are accepted via USAjobs.

Salary
In 2022, the starting salary for a newly hired member of the Supreme Court Police is $73,852 a year. 

The Supreme Court Police also accept lateral hires from Local, State and Federal agencies. The starting salary for a lateral hire is $73,852–$126,255.

See also
List of United States federal law enforcement agencies

References

Government agencies established in 1949
Police
Federal law enforcement agencies of the United States
Law enforcement agencies of the District of Columbia
Agency-specific police departments of the United States
Court security